Henriquella spicata is a species of blow fly in the family Mesembrinellidae.

References

Mesembrinellidae
Diptera of South America
Insects described in 1925